The Philippines national rugby team may refer to one of the Philippines' national team in rugby sports:

Men
Philippines national rugby union team (fifteens XV labing lima)
Philippines national rugby union team (sevens)
Philippines national rugby league team (league thirteens XIII labing tatlo)

Women
Philippines women's national rugby league team (league thirteens XIII labing tatlo)
Philippines women's national rugby union team (fifteens XV labing lima)
Philippines women's national rugby union team (sevens)